Statistical Methods for Research Workers is a classic book on statistics, written by the statistician R. A. Fisher. It is considered by some to be one of the 20th century's most influential books on statistical methods, together with his The Design of Experiments (1935). It was originally published in 1925, by Oliver & Boyd (Edinburgh); the final and posthumous 14th edition was published in 1970.

Reviews

According to Denis Conniffe:
Ronald A. Fisher was "interested in application and in the popularization
of statistical methods and his early book Statistical Methods for Research Workers, published in 1925, went through many editions and
motivated and influenced the practical use of statistics in many fields of
study. His Design of Experiments (1935)  [promoted] statistical technique and application. In that book he
emphasized examples and how to design experiments systematically from
a statistical point of view. The mathematical justification of the methods
described was not stressed and, indeed, proofs were often barely sketched
or omitted altogether ..., a fact which led H. B. Mann to fill the gaps with a rigorous mathematical treatment in his well-known treatise, ."

Chapters

 Prefaces
 Introduction
 Diagrams
 Distributions
 Tests of Goodness of Fit, Independence and Homogeneity; with table of χ2
 Tests of Significance of Means, Difference of Means, and Regression Coefficients
 The Correlation Coefficient
 Intraclass Correlations and the Analysis of Variance
 Further Applications of the Analysis of Variance
 SOURCES USED FOR DATA AND METHODS INDEX

In the second edition of 1928 a chapter 9 was added: The Principles of Statistical Estimation.

See also
 The Design of Experiments

Notes

Further reading 
 The March 1951 issue of the Journal of the American Statistical Association contains articles celebrating the 25th anniversary of the publication of the first edition.
A.W.F. Edwards (2005) "R. A. Fisher, Statistical Methods for Research Workers, 1925," in I. Grattan-Guinness (ed) Landmark Writings in Western Mathematics: Case Studies, 1640-1940, Amsterdam: Elsevier.

Reviews 
 Nature anonymous review of Fisher’s Statistical Methods 
 BMJ anonymous review of Fisher’s Statistical Methods 
Student’s review of Fisher’s Statistical Methods
Egon Pearson’s reviews of Fisher’s Statistical Methods
Harold Hotelling’s review of Fishers’ Statistical Methods
Leon Isserlis’s review of Fishers’ Statistical Methods
W. P. Elderton’sreview of Fisher’s Statistical Methods

External links 
Text of first edition
The 14th edition (prepared from notes left by Fisher when he died in 1962) is reprinted as the first part of Statistical Methods, Experimental Design and Scientific Inference

History of probability and statistics
Statistics books
1925 non-fiction books